Emuruangogolak is an active shield volcano straddling the Gregory Rift in Kenya, in Eastern Africa. It has a  caldera on its summit. The last known eruption was a trachyte flow which occurred in 1910. Steam vents and fumarolic activity continues from fissures within the caldera and along the flanks of the volcano. Several maar lakes exist in the rift valley adjacent to the volcano.  The volcano's summit is at  elevation, and its formation is calculated to have been 38,000 years ago.

See also
List of volcanoes in Kenya

References

Volcanoes of Kenya
Active volcanoes
Pleistocene shield volcanoes
Holocene shield volcanoes